Chelliah Kumarasuriar was a Sri Lankan politician. He served as the Minister of Posts and Telecommunications (1970-1977) and a Member of Senate of Ceylon. He was a political rival of Alfred Duraiappah and was initially suspected of behind his death.  However, the assassination was widely blamed on the rebel Liberation Tigers of Tamil Eelam (LTTE) and its leader V. Prabhakaran. On 25 April 1978 the LTTE issued an open letter, which was published in the Virakesari, claiming responsibility for the assassination of eleven people including Duraiappah.

References

Members of the Senate of Ceylon
Posts ministers of Sri Lanka
Sri Lanka Freedom Party politicians
Sri Lankan Tamil politicians
Telecommunication ministers of Sri Lanka
Year of birth missing
Year of death missing